The Azerbaijan Communist Party is a communist party in Azerbaijan.

Note that there are two parties named "Communist Party of Azerbaijan". They are completely different parties, with completely different leaders. One is a member of the "UPC-CPSU", while the other one is a member of the "CPSU (2001)".

Ideology 
The AzKP often criticizes United States politics in the region. In 2004 after the US State Department told that US was not planning to impose sanctions on Nagorno Karabakh, Ahmadov said that the Americans underhandedly supported the Armenian interests and that Washington was not interested in the settlement of the conflict. He also added that the great powers are making use of the Karabakh conflict for their own interests.

The AzKP was strongly against the Azeri participation into the Iraq War and it often expressed solidarity to Palestinian people and Cuba

Fractions

1996 
A splinter group from the main Communist Party of Azerbaijan (led by Firudin Hasanov) was formed in 1996. CPA-2 developed close relation with the government of the country and for a brief period it was the only legally registered communist party in the country.

Hasanov was a candidate in Azerbaijan's 1998 presidential election and he arrived fourth obtaining 29.224 votes (0.87%). Leaders of the other Azeri communist parties describe Hasanov as a "traitor" for his collaboration with the government.

In 2000 the newspaper "Bu Gun" reported that Hasanov was considering a merger with the ruling New Azerbaijan Party (NAP), but the party's press secretary Seyran Veliev refuted such claims, saying they had no intention of merging with the NAP.

2011 
It was founded on 31 October 2011 by the merger of the Azerbaijan Communist Party (on Platform of Marxism–Leninism) (ACP-PM-L) and the Communist Party of Azerbaijan headed by Alasgar Khalilov. At the unification congress Telman Nurullayev, the former head of the (AKP-PML), was elected the party's First Secretary and was also elected to the Politburo. Representatives from fraternal communist parties, such as the Socialist Party of Latvia and the Communist Party of the Soviet Union, were presented at the congress.

Leaders 
On 10 September 2007, party chief Ramiz Ahmadov died after a long illness. His body was sent for burial in his native Quba. From 2000 to 2005 Ahmadov had been a member of the National Assembly of Azerbaijan.

Rauf Gurbanov was elected chairman of the party after a long dispute with Rustam Shahsuvarov. Gurbanov was replaced by Haji Hajiyev.

Results 
The party claims that it has 60.000 members. The party publishes the newspaper Azərbaycan Həqiqəti.

In the parliamentary election of 5 November 2000 and 7 January 2001, the party won 6.3% of the popular vote and 2 out of 125 seats.

In the parliamentary elections of 6 November 2005 won no seats, but the chairman Ramiz Ahmadov was not running due to health problems.

In the municipal election of 17 December 2004, the party did very well and it elected 128 members to the local municipalities.

In the presidential election of 15 October 2008, the AzKP supported the candidate from the Yeni Azerbaijan ruling party, current president of Azerbaijan Ilham Aliyev.

The AzKP is part of the Communist Party of the Soviet Union (2001).

References

External links 
  

1993 establishments in Azerbaijan
Communist parties in Azerbaijan
Political parties established in 1993
Political parties in Azerbaijan
International Meeting of Communist and Workers Parties